Seatoun AFC is a football club in New Zealand, based in the Wellington suburb of Seatoun. The club was founded in 1909 by Charlie Webb.  One of the strongest clubs in the country during the 1950s, it won the national knockout Chatham Cup in 1957 and 1958. Their 1958 win, a 7–1 win over Christchurch City, remains the highest score by any team in a Chatham Cup final (equalled in 1989 by Christchurch United). 11 players (senior men) have represented NZ whilst playing for Seatoun - Grahame Bilby, Rex Boyes, Keith Gibson, Bert Hiddlestone, Mike Jones, Ron Kearns, Rodney Reid, Duncan Ritchie, Dave Strom, Phil Traynor, Ian Upchurch.  Also a number of international players have played for Seatoun at some stage including Paul Rennell, Shane Rufer, Michael Utting, Jeff Strom, Rupert Ryan, Billy Harris, Paul Cameron, Garry Welch. In 2013 the Seatoun AFC First Team, coached by player/coach Steve Dimakis, beat Marist AFC 3–2 in a playoff for promotion to Capital Premier. This was the third consecutive promotion for the team, having risen from Capital 3 in 2010, mostly due to the great play of Hamdi Yusuf and Doug Moalay. However, times have been tough recently for the club, received three straight demotions down to capital two. The Seatoun first team gained promotion into Capital 1 after a highly successful 2018 season that saw them 12 points above their nearest competition on the table.

Teams

Senior Men's
 Seatoun AFC First Team (Capital Premier)
 Seatoun AFC Reserves (Capital 2)
 Seatoun AFC (Capital 6)

Masters
 Seatoun Mariners (Masters Division 1)
 Seatoun AFC (Masters Division 3)
 Seatoun Originals (Masters Over 42 League)
 Seatoun Vorstermans Architect 99s (Masters Over 42 League)

Women's
 Women's W-League

U17s Youth Teams 
 Under 17A (Under 17 A division 2019)
 Under 17B (Under 17 C division 2018)

External links
Once mighty, still proud

Association football clubs in Wellington
Sport in Wellington City
1909 establishments in New Zealand
Association football clubs established in 1909